The  is a Japanese railway line owned and operated by the Kintetsu Railway, a private railway operator. It connects the cities of Kyoto, Uji, and Nara, and competes with the Nara Line of West Japan Railway Company (JR-West), which also connects those cities.

Many trains on the line continue to the Nara Line to Kintetsu Nara Station or the Kashihara Line via Yamato-Saidaiji Station. The line also provides the through train services with the Karasuma Line of Kyoto Municipal Subway.

History
The track between Kyoto Station and Horiuchi Station (present-day Kintetsu-Tambabashi Station) was placed on the site of a removed railway, which had been rerouted and is now called the JR Nara Line.

The railway provided the through services to the lines of Kintetsu (originally, Osaka Electric Tramway) from the beginning. As of September 1961, Kintetsu was the largest shareholder of Nara Electric Railway with 980,000 shares out of the company's 1.9 million shares, while Keihan Electric Railway owned 710,000 shares. Through a deal between the two major shareholders, the shares owned by Keihan were transferred to Kintetsu in April 1962 and the company was merged into Kintetsu from October 1963.

Between 1945 and 1968, there were through services with the Keihan Main Line using crossovers at Tambabashi. The line voltage was increased to 1,500 V DC in 1969, and in 1988 through services with the Karasuma Line were introduced.

Stations
S: All trains stop
M: Only express trains operated from Kyoto to Kintetsu Miyazu stop
X: limited stop of limited express trains (northbound in the morning and southbound in the evening and night)
|: Trains pass
Local trains stop at every station between Kyoto and Yamato-Saidaiji.
SE: Semi-express
Ex: Express
LE: Limited express

Trains down to
Local: Nara, 
Express: Nara, Kashiharajingū-mae
Limited Express: Nara, Kashiharajingū-mae,

References
This article incorporates material from the corresponding article in the Japanese Wikipedia.

External links
Tourist Guide of Kintetsu

Kyoto Line
Kyoto Municipal Subway
Rail transport in Kyoto Prefecture
Rail transport in Nara Prefecture
Standard gauge railways in Japan
Railway lines opened in 1928
1928 establishments in Japan